Herbert Danson (21 June 1883 – 11 December 1963) was an English professional footballer who played as a forward in the Football League for Preston North End.

Personal life 
Dawson served in the British Armed Forces during the First World War and was wounded in the back.

Honours 
Southport
 Lancashire Senior Cup: 1904–05

Career statistics

References 

English footballers
English Football League players
Association football inside forwards
Preston North End F.C. players

Association football outside forwards
Footballers from Preston, Lancashire
1883 births
1963 deaths
Southport F.C. players
Nelson F.C. players
Lancaster City F.C. players
British military personnel of World War I